Franka Kamerawerk was a manufacturer of camera equipment situated in Bayreuth, Germany.  It was founded by Franz Vyskocil in 1909. Company was known under several names during its life: Vysko-Fabrik Franz Vyskocil; Weigand & Vyskocil; Frankonia-Kamerawerk; Hogaschwerk; Franka-Kamerawerk. By 1958 Franka had 154 employees and production of 650,000 cameras. 

In 1962 Franka was sold to Henry Wirgin (Wirgin) and camera production ceased in 1967.

Camera models 
 Bonafix
 Bubi
 Champion
 Francolor
 Franka
 Frankamatic
 Frankarette
 Record
 Rolfix
 Rollop
 Solida
 Solida Record
 Solida Jr.
 Super Frankarette
 Weitz

Citations 

German cameras
Photography companies of Germany
Bayreuth
135 film cameras
German companies established in 1909
Manufacturing companies established in 1909